Microbacterium soli is a Gram-positive, aerobic, rod-shaped and non-motile bacterium from the genus Microbacterium which has been isolated from soil from a ginseng field in Daejeon, South Korea.

References

External links 
Type strain of Microbacterium soli at BacDive -  the Bacterial Diversity Metadatabase

Bacteria described in 2010
soli